Jack Badley was a West Indian cricket umpire. He stood in one Test match, West Indies vs. England, in 1930.

See also
 List of Test cricket umpires

References

Year of birth missing
Year of death missing
Place of birth missing
West Indian Test cricket umpires